Survivor Greece is the Greek version of the popular reality show Survivor.

This version of the show was aired on Mega TV for two seasons from 2003 to 2004. While the series was titled Survivor, it also took elements from Survivors predecessor Expedition Robinson such as that of the North and South teams. While the series was not considered a flop, it did not achieve the ratings that Mega TV had hoped for and at the end of its second season it was cancelled only to be brought back two years later for a joint season with Turkey. After 7 years, on 13 February 2017, the show came back on Skai TV with Sakis Tanimanidis as host. From season 6 (2018) Giorgos Lianos joined the show as a  co-host. At 2020 Tanimanidis left the show and Lianos became the main host.

 Format and rules 

For the Mega TV editions (seasons 1-4) Greek Survivor followed the format of American Survivor, with added twists such as Redemption Island (where voted out players could return). The show produced more episodes than the American version, usually splitting a week's episodes between the reward and the immunity challenges, but the main format remained close to the original CBS one.

In the event of a tie at Tribal Councils, contestants competed in a duel in order to determine who would be eliminated. Additionally, when a player was forced out of the game due to sickness, he/she couldn't be a member of jury. As seen in season two, if jury members did not wish to cast a vote for a winner they were not required to.

After Skai TV picked up the production rights in a collaboration with producer Acun Ilıcalı, the format of the game completely changed. Challenges pitted people in 1v1 (or sometimes 2v2 or 3v3) situations, with the winner gifting their team a point. Teams that reached 10 points first won the challenge (like a volleyball match).

Another major change was the introduction of fan voting. The tribe who lost Immunity Challenge had to select two or three players to be in the Elimination Vote. The fans, through calls and texts, then chose the Survivor who should leave the game. This change required the game to be broadcast with minimal delay (usually 2 days) in order for the fans to vote in time. Fans voting was the deciding factor in the Semi Final and Final too, with no jury in place.

The general success of the show, pushed the production team to extend the duration of the game, usually by introducing new players in later stages. This tactic pushed Season 6 to drag for 177 days, which many considered it made it stale.

Series overview

 Greek Survivor season 

 Season One 
 
 Date: 18 September 2003 – 28 December 2003 (29 episodes).
 Location: Malaysia, Southeast Asia.
 Hosted: Grigoris ArnaoutoglouSurvivor 1, was the first edition of the Greek version of the popular reality show Survivor and it aired from September 2003 to December 2003, every Thursday and Sunday night.

The winner of season one was Evangelia Dermetzoglou.

 Season Two 
 
 Date: September 26, 2004 – December 28, 2004 (42 episodes).
 Location: Malaysia, Southeast Asia.
 Hosted: Grigoris Arnaoutoglou.Survivor 2, was the second edition of the Greek version of the popular reality show Survivor and it aired from September 2004 to December 2004, every Friday, Saturday and Sunday night

The winner of season two was Konstantinos Hristodoulakis.

 Season Three 
 
 Date: September 23, 2006 – December 28, 2006 (27 episodes).
 Location: Pearl Islands, Panama (Final: Buenos Aires, Argentina).
 Hosted: Konstantinos Markoulakis.Survivor 3 or Greece vs. Turkey was the third season of the Survivor to air in Greece and the second season to air in Turkey.

This season premiered on Saturday, September 23, 2006 and it aired from September 2006 to December of that same year, every Tuesday and Thursday night. This was the first time that either country's branch of the franchise competed with another country and because of this, the major twist this season was that the tribes were divided up by country of origin.

The winner of season three was Derya Durmuşlar.

 Season Four  
 Date: February 15, 2010 – June 2, 2010 (20 episodes).
 Location: Patagonia, South America.
 Hosted: Giannis AivazisSurvivor: Patagonia or Patagonia: The Edge of the World was the fourth season of the Survivor to air in Greece. This season premiered on Monday, February 15, 2010 and it aired from February 2010 to June of that same year, every Sunday night.

The winner of season four was Vangelis Gerasimou.

 Season Five 

 Date: February 13, 2017 – July 5, 2017 (90 episodes).
 Location: Las Terrenas, Samaná, Dominican Republic.
 Hosted: Sakis Tanimanidis (From the island). Eleonora Meleti (Survivor Panorama - From Greece).Survivor 2017 was the fifth season of the Survivor to air in Greece from Skai TV and in Cyprus from Sigma TV. Premiered on February 13, 2017 and the final was on July 5, 2017 with the host Sakis Tanimanidis. It aired 4 nights a week, from Sunday to Wednesday (for some time it also aired on Thursdays)

Twelve players and twelve celebrities have been known in Greece through their work are invited to survive on a deserted island, the exotic Dominican Republic, for 5 months, having their luggage, the necessary clothes and basic food supply.

The winner of season five was Giorgos 'Danos' Angelopoulos.

Season Six

 Date: January 21, 2018 – July 13, 2018 (117 episodes).
 Location: Las Terrenas, Samaná, Dominican Republic. 
 Hosted: Sakis Tanimanidis and Giorgos Lianos (From the island). Doretta Papadimitriou (Survivor Panorama or Edo Survivor - From Greece).Survivor 2018 was the sixth season to air in Greece from Skai TV and in Cyprus from Sigma TV. This series premiered on January 21, 2018 with Sakis Tanimanidis as the host. It aired 4 nights a week, from Sunday to Wednesday (for some time it also aired on Thursdays)

Twelve players; and twelve celebrities; have been known in Greece through their work are invited to survive on a deserted island, the exotic Dominican Republic, for 6 months, having their luggage, the necessary clothes and basic food supply. More players joined the game later.

Winner of season six was Ilias Gotsis.

Season Seven
 Date: February 2, 2019 – June 30, 2019 (118 episodes).
 Location: La Romana, Dominican Republic.
 Hosted:   
 Greece: Sakis Tanimanidis and Giorgos Lianos (From the island). Bagia Antonopoulou (Survivor Panorama - From Greece).
 Turkey: Acun Ilicali and Murat Ceylan.Survivor 7 or Greece vs. Turkey is the seventh season of Survivor airing in Greece and the thirteenth season airing in Turkey. It aired 5 nights a week, from Saturday to Wednesday (for some time it also aired on Thursdays)

The Greek winner was Katerina Dalaka.

The Turkish winner was Yusuf Karakaya.

 

Season Eight
                                                                                                                                                                                        
 Date: December 27, 2020 - July 5, 2021 (108 episodes).
 Location: La Romana, Dominican Republic.
 Hosted: Giorgos LianosSurvivor 8 was the eighth season of Survivor airing in Greece. It aired 4 nights a week, from Sunday to Wednesday.

Season Nine
                                                                                                                                                                                        
 Date: December 26, 2021 - July 6, 2022 (135 episodes).
 Location: La Romana, Dominican Republic.
 Hosted by: Giorgos LianosSurvivor 9''''' was the ninth season of Survivor airing in Greece. It aired 4 nights a week, from Sunday to Wednesday.

External links
 (Season 1 Official Site Archive) 
 (Season 2 Official Site Archive) 
 (Survivor 2017 statistics page) 

Mega Channel original programming
Skai TV original programming
2003 Greek television series debuts
2017 Greek television series debuts
Greek reality television series
Greece